There are several protected areas of Suriname. The largest of these is the Central Suriname Nature Reserve, a UNESCO World Heritage Site. The protected areas are managed by the Suriname Forest Service. The Forest Service has appointed STINASU (Stichting Natuurbehoud Suriname), a non-profit foundation, to develop and conduct the educational and tourist aspects in the protected areas. As of 2020, 14.5% of the land territory is protected, and contains one nature park, and 13 nature reserves.

Nature reserves 

 Brinckheuvel. Established 1961. 60 square kilometres.
 Coppename. Established 1961. 120 square kilometres.
 Wia Wia Nature Reserve. Established 1966. 360 square kilometres.
 Galibi Nature Reserve. Established 1969. 40 square kilometres.
 Sipaliwini Savanna. Established 1972. 1000 square kilometres
 Boven Coesewijne. Established 1986. 270 square kilometres.
 Peruvia. Established 1986. 310 square kilometres.
 Wanekreek Nature Reserve. Established 1986. 450 square kilometres.
 Copi Nature Reserve. Established 1986. 180 square kilometres.
 Central. Established 1998. 16000 square kilometres.

Nature Park 

 Brownsberg Nature Park. Established 1969. 122 square kilometres

Special management areas 
 Bigi Pan. Established 1987. 679 square kilometers. 
 . Established 2001. 150 square kilometers.
 . Established 2001. 830 square kilometers.
 . Established 2002. 650 square kilometers. Braamspunt became part of the management area in 2015.

Protected areas 
 Hertenrits. Archaeological site. Established 1972. 1 square kilometres.
 Werehpai and Iwana Samu Protected Area. Petroglyphs. Established 2007. 180 square kilometers
 Peperpot. Plantation. Established 2009. 700 hectares.

References

External links
 STINASU Foundation for Nature Protection at Facebook

 
Suriname
Environment of Suriname
Geography of Suriname
 
Protected areas